Lukas Enqvist (born 6 April 1998) is a Swedish ice hockey player. He is currently playing with Timrå IK of the Swedish Hockey League (SHL). He previously played with Färjestad BK.

Career
Born in Karlstad, Sweden, Enqvist played junior hockey, with local team Färjestad BK. In 2012–13, he debuted at the under-16 level as a 15-year-old, playing eight games in the J16 SM. The following season he dressed for 17 U-16 games, recording seven goals and five assists. He also competed with a regional all-star team from Värmland in the annual TV-pucken, an under-15 national tournament, and notched one goal and three assists over eight games. In 2014–15, Enqvist move on to Färjestad BK's J20 SuperElit team at 17 years old. In 2015-16, Enqvist made his SHL debut with Färjestad BK.

Career statistics

Regular season and playoffs

References

External links

1998 births
Living people
Färjestad BK players
Swedish ice hockey forwards
Sportspeople from Karlstad